Sir Peter Sainthill F.R.S. (1698 - 1775) was a British 18th century surgeon and a Fellow of the Royal Society who served as Master of the Company of Surgeons (1749-1750).

Life and career 
Sainthill was born in 1698 and was the son of Dr. Peter and Margret Sainthill (née Upton). He married Frances Palmer, the wealthy heiress of Samuel Palmer FRS. They had one daughter, Margret who married Sir Hew Dalrymple of North Berwick, 2nd Bt. in 1743.

Sainthill spent the majority of his career at St. Bartholomew's Hospital.

References 

1698 births
1775 deaths
Fellows of the Royal Society
British surgeons